Bolidophyceae is a class of photosynthetic heterokont picophytoplankton, and consist of less than 20 known species. They are distinguished by the angle of flagellar insertion and swimming patterns as well as recent molecular analyses. Bolidophyceae is the sister taxon to the diatoms (Bacillariophyceae). They lack the characteristic theca of the diatoms, and have been proposed as an intermediate group between the diatoms and all other heterokonts.

Taxonomy
 Class Bolidophyceae Guillou & Chretiennot-Dinet 1999
 Order Parmales Booth & Marchant 1987
 Family Pentalaminaceae Marchant 1987
 Genus Pentalamina Marchant 1987
 Species Pentalamina corona Marchant 1987
 Family Triparmaceae Booth & Marchant 1988
 Genus Tetraparma Booth 1987 
 Species T. catinifera 
 Species T. gracilis 
 Species T. insecta Bravo-Sierra & Hernández-Becerril 2003
 Species T. pelagica Booth & Marchant 1987
 Species T. silverae Fujita & Jordan 2017
 Species T. trullifera Fujita & Jordan 2017
 Genus Triparma Booth & Marchant 1987
 Species T. columacea Booth 1987
 Species T. eleuthera Ichinomiya & Lopes dos Santos 2016
 Species T. laevis Booth 1987
 Species T. mediterranea (Guillou & Chrétiennot-Dinet) Ichinomiya & Lopes dos Santos 2016
 Species T. pacifica (Guillou & Chrétiennot-Dinet) Ichinomiya & Lopes dos Santos 2016
 Species T. retinervis Booth 1987
 Species T. strigata Booth 1987
 Species T. verrucosa Booth 1987

Gallery
In the gallery, all scale bar represent 1 μm.

References

External links

SEM images of Bolidophyceae (Parmales): http://www.mikrotax.org/Nannotax3/index.php?dir=non_cocco/Parmales

Heterokont classes
Ochrophyta